The 2015 Offaly Senior Hurling Championship was the 117th staging of the Offaly Senior Hurling Championship since its establishment by the Offaly Cound Board in 1896. The championship began on 17 April 2015 and ended on 18 October 2015.

Kilcormac–Killoughey were the defending champions, however, they were defeated by St Rynagh's at the semi-final stage. Shamrocks entered the championship as a promoted team.

On 18 October 2015, Coolderry won the championship following a 2-15 to 1-16 defeat of St Rynagh's in the final. This was their 30th championship title, their first in four championship seasons.

Teams

All but one of the twelve teams from the 2014 championship participated in the top tier of Offaly hurling in 2015.

Shamrocks, who defeated St Rynagh's by 0-22 tp 1-6 in the final of the intermediate championship in 2014, gained automatic promotion to the senior championship.

Similarly, Kinnitty defeated Drumcullen by 0-17 to 0-12 in the 2014 senior relegation play-off, and so Drumcullen were relegated to the intermediate grade for 2015.

Results

Group 1

Group 2

Relegation play-offs

Quarter-finals

Semi-finals

Final

References

Offaly Senior Hurling Championship
Offaly Senior Hurling Championship